Eflani is a town and district of Karabük Province in the Black Sea region of Turkey. Eflani is located at 100 km south of the Black Sea. 46 km away from, and to the east of Karabük, it is settled on a plateau divided by small rivers among the high mountains and valleys. According to the 2000 census, population of the district is 12,270 of which 3,897 live in the town of Eflani.

History
In Eflani, the traces of past civilizations are the rock tombs, and mosques in the center in the periphery. Eflani served on the route connecting the Amasra colony with inner Anatolia in and the Middle Ages. Between 1292 and 1309, the town was center of the Jandarids.

Education
There are five school in Eflani.  Eflani İMKB Çok Programlı Lisesi is one of them and English is a second language in this school.

Eflani today
Having a very rich vegetation due to its humid climate, Eflani serves as a promenade site for the region, with its forests and three ponds. For a certain period, the demand for animals and animal products in the region was met by Eflani, and today the animal breeding though lost its former significance, is still an important subsistence.

What makes Eflani significant in the province are the rich marble ores. The marbles are extracted as blocks and are exported by companies of private sector.

Image gallery

Notes

References

External links

District governor's official web site 
Local website giving information on Eflani 
Eflani News 
Eflani introductory web site 

Populated places in Karabük Province
Districts of Karabük Province